Harualchhari is a union of Bhujpur Thana, Fatikchhari Upazila of Chittagong District.

Geography
Area of Harualchhari : .

Location
 North: Bhujpur Union
 East:  Fatikchhari Upazila
 South: Suabil Union
 West:  Sitakunda Mountain Range

Population
As of 2011 Bangladesh census, Harualchari Union has a population of 40000.

Iqbal Hossain Chowdhury is the current chairman of the union elected consecutively second time in UP election 2016.

Villages and mouzas
Harualchhari, Lomba Bill, Mohansapara, Koratipara, Borbill, Hazarkill, Porbo Fatickchari

Education
 Uttar Harualchhari Government Primary School
 Hrualchhari High School.(Present Head Teacher: Mohammad Kamrul Haider).
 Gawsia Rahmania Sunnia Madrasha
 Middle Harualchhari Govt. Primary School
 Middle Fatickchhari (Mohansah Para) Govt. Primary School
 Porbo Fatickchari Government primary school

References

Unions of Bhujpur Thana